Melanie J. McCann (born 8 October 1989) is a Canadian modern pentathlete and a member of the Canadian national team. McCann placed 4th at the 2011 Pan American Games which qualified her to compete in the following Olympics. At the 2012 Summer Olympics, she finished in 11th place in the women's competition.  In June 2016, she was named in Canada's Olympic team, and finished 15h at the Olympics.

References

External links
  
 
 
 

1989 births
Living people
Canadian female modern pentathletes
Pan American Games competitors for Canada
Olympic modern pentathletes of Canada
Modern pentathletes at the 2012 Summer Olympics
Modern pentathletes at the 2011 Pan American Games
Modern pentathletes at the 2015 Pan American Games
World Modern Pentathlon Championships medalists
Modern pentathletes at the 2016 Summer Olympics
20th-century Canadian women
21st-century Canadian women